Md Hasanuzzaman (born 1 June 1991) is a Bangladeshi cricketer. He made his Twenty20 (T20) debut on 12 November 2016 playing for Khulna Titans in the 2016–17 Bangladesh Premier League. He made his first-class debut for Khulna Division in the 2016–17 National Cricket League on 3 January 2017.

A right-handed opener batsman and part-time off spin bowler, Hasanuzzaman has played Bangladeshi domestic cricket for Khulna Titans and the Khulna Division.

References

External links
 

1991 births
Living people
Bangladeshi cricketers
Victoria Sporting Club cricketers
Khulna Division cricketers
Khulna Tigers cricketers
People from Jessore District